Marianne Bruus Jelved (née Hirsbro, born 5 September 1943 in Aarhus) is a Danish politician, who is a member of the Folketing for the Danish Social Liberal Party. She was elected into parliament in the 1994 Danish general election and had previously sat in parliament from 1987 to 1993. She is a former Minister of Economic Affairs, Nordic Cooperation, Culture and Ecclesiastical Affairs.

Background
Jelved is educated as a teacher and has a Master's degree in education from the Danish School of Education. She worked as a primary school teacher for 22 years.

Political career
Jelved was in the municipal council of Gundsø Municipality from 1982 to 1989.

She was elected to the Parliament of Denmark in 1987 for the Danish Social Liberal Party (Radikale Venstre). In 1990 she became political leader of the party. During the 1990s she served as Minister of Economic Affairs (1993–2001) and Minister for Nordic Cooperation (1994–2001) in two Social Democratic governments. In 2007 MP Naser Khader and MEP Anders Samuelsen broke away from the party in protest to form the New Alliance, today known as Liberal Alliance. Jelved resigned as political leader in 2007 following a drop in opinion polls and criticism from within the party. She remained an MP, serving as Minister of Culture from 2012–2015 and Minister of Ecclesiastical Affairs from 2014–2015 in Prime Minister Helle Thorning-Schmidt's three-way government coalition. As of the 2019 elections, she is the oldest member of parliament.

Bibliography
Alt har sin pris (1999)
Jelveds Danmark (2006)

References

Notes

1943 births
Living people
People from Gentofte Municipality
Danish writers
Danish educators
Danish Social Liberal Party politicians
Government ministers of Denmark
20th-century Danish women politicians
21st-century Danish women politicians
Women government ministers of Denmark
Danish municipal councillors 
Women members of the Folketing
Members of the Folketing 1987–1988
Members of the Folketing 1988–1990
Members of the Folketing 1990–1994
Members of the Folketing 1994–1998
Members of the Folketing 1998–2001
Members of the Folketing 2001–2005
Members of the Folketing 2005–2007
Members of the Folketing 2007–2011
Members of the Folketing 2011–2015
Members of the Folketing 2015–2019
Members of the Folketing 2019–2022
Leaders of the Danish Social Liberal Party